Urophora terebrans is a species of tephritid or fruit flies in the genus Urophora of the family Tephritidae.

Distribution
France, Spain, Germany & Poland South to Italy, Turkey & Caucasus.

References

Urophora
Insects described in 1850
Diptera of Europe